Khojimat Erkinov (born 29 May 2001) is an Uzbekistan footballer who plays for Russian club Torpedo Moscow and Uzbekistan national football team.

Career

Club career
He made his debut in the Uzbekistan Super League for Kokand 1912 on 30 July 2019 in a game against Sogdiana Jizzakh.

On 8 July 2022, Erkinov signed a three-year contract with Russian Premier League club FC Torpedo Moscow.

International
He made his debut for main team, Uzbekistan on 3 September 2020 in a Friendly match against Tajikistan. On 23 September 2022, Erkinov scored his first goal in a friendly match against Cameroon.

Career statistics

Club

International

Statistics accurate as of match played 16 November 2022.

References

External links

2001 births
Sportspeople from Tashkent
Living people
Uzbekistani footballers
Uzbekistan international footballers
Association football midfielders
FC AGMK players
Pakhtakor Tashkent FK players
FC Torpedo Moscow players
Uzbekistan Super League players
Russian Premier League players
Uzbekistani expatriate footballers
Expatriate footballers in Russia
Uzbekistani expatriate sportspeople in Russia